Nuclear sharing is a concept in NATO's policy of nuclear deterrence, which allows member countries without nuclear weapons of their own to participate in the planning for the use of nuclear weapons by NATO. In particular, it provides for the armed forces of those countries to be involved in delivering nuclear weapons in the event of their use.

As part of nuclear sharing, the participating countries carry out consultations and make common decisions on nuclear weapons policy, maintain technical equipment (notably nuclear-capable airplanes) required for the use of nuclear weapons and store nuclear weapons on their territory. In case of war, the United States has told NATO allies the Non-Proliferation Treaty (NPT) would no longer be in effect.

NATO

Of the three nuclear powers in NATO (France, the United Kingdom and the United States), only the United States is known to have provided weapons for nuclear sharing. , Belgium, Germany, Italy, the Netherlands and Turkey are hosting U.S. nuclear weapons as part of NATO's nuclear sharing policy. Canada hosted weapons under the control of the North American Aerospace Defense Command (NORAD), rather than NATO, until 1984, and Greece until 2001. The United Kingdom also received U.S. tactical nuclear weapons such as nuclear artillery and Lance missiles until 1992, even though the UK is a nuclear-weapon state in its own right; these were mainly deployed in Germany.

In peacetime, the nuclear weapons stored in non-nuclear countries are guarded by United States Air Force (USAF) personnel and previously, some nuclear artillery and missile systems were guarded by United States Army (USA) personnel; the Permissive Action Link codes required for arming them remain under American control. In case of war, the weapons are to be mounted on the participating countries' warplanes. The weapons are under custody and control of USAF Munitions Support Squadrons co-located on NATO main operating bases who work together with the host nation forces.

, 100 tactical B61 nuclear bombs are believed to be deployed in Europe under the nuclear sharing arrangement. The weapons are stored within a vault in hardened aircraft shelters, using the USAF WS3 Weapon Storage and Security System. The delivery warplanes used are F-16s and Panavia Tornados.

Historically, the shared nuclear weapon delivery systems were not restricted to bombs. Greece used Nike-Hercules Missiles as well as A-7 Corsair II attack aircraft. Canada had Bomarc nuclear-armed anti-aircraft missiles, Honest John surface-to-surface missiles and the AIR-2 Genie nuclear-armed air-to-air rocket, as well as tactical nuclear bombs for the CF-104 fighter. PGM-19 Jupiter medium-range ballistic missiles were shared with Italian air force units and Turkish units with U.S. dual key systems to enable the warheads. PGM-17 Thor intermediate-range ballistic missiles were forward deployed to the UK with RAF crews. An extended version of nuclear sharing, the NATO Multilateral Force was a plan to equip NATO surface ships of the member states with UGM-27 Polaris missiles, but the UK ended up purchasing the Polaris missiles and using its own warheads, and the plan to equip NATO surface ships was abandoned.
After the Soviet Union collapsed, the nuclear weapon types shared within NATO were reduced to tactical nuclear bombs deployed by Dual-Capable Aircraft (DCA). According to the press, Eastern European Member States of NATO have resisted the withdrawal of the shared nuclear bombs from Europe, fearing it would show a weakening of U.S. commitment to defend Europe against Russia.

In Italy, B61 bombs are stored at the Ghedi Air Base and at the Aviano Air Base. According to the former Italian President Francesco Cossiga, Italy's plans of retaliation during the Cold War consisted of targeting nuclear weapons in Czechoslovakia and Hungary in the event the Soviet Union waged nuclear war against NATO. He acknowledged the presence of U.S. nuclear weapons in Italy, and speculated about the possible presence of British and French nuclear weapons.

The only German nuclear base is located in Büchel Air Base, near the border with Luxembourg. The base has 11 Protective Aircraft Shelters (PAS) equipped with WS3 Vaults for storage of nuclear weapons, each with a maximum capacity of 44 B61 nuclear bombs. There are 20 B61 bombs stored on the base for delivery by German PA-200 Tornado IDS bombers of the JaBoG 33 squadron. By 2024 Germany's Tornado IDS aircraft are due to be retired, and it is unclear what nuclear sharing role, if any, Germany will then retain. In 2022, after the Russian invasion of Ukraine, Germany announced that it would buy 35 F-35 jets to replace the Tornado in its nuclear sharing role.
On 10 June 2013, former Dutch prime minister Ruud Lubbers confirmed the existence of 22 shared nuclear bombs at Volkel Air Base. This was inadvertently confirmed again in June 2019 when a public draft report to the NATO Parliamentary Assembly was discovered to reference the existence of US nuclear weapons at Volkel, as well as locations in Belgium, Italy, Germany, and Turkey. A new version of the report was released on 11 July 2019 without reference to the locations of the weapons.

In 2017 due to an increasingly unstable relationship between the United States and Turkey it was suggested that the United States consider removing 50 tactical nuclear weapons stored under American control at the Incirlik Air Base in Turkey. The presence of US nuclear weapons in Turkey gained increased public attention in October 2019 with the deterioration of relations between the two nations after the Turkish military incursion into Syria.

In 2022, after the Russian invasion of Ukraine, reports appeared about the possible inclusion of Poland in the NATO nuclear sharing program.

Weapon List

Current:
B61 nuclear bomb (Belgium, Germany, Italy, Netherlands, and Turkey)
Former:
AIR-2 Genie (Canada)
B57 nuclear bomb (Canada, United Kingdom, and West Germany)
B28 nuclear bomb (Canada, and the United Kingdom)
B43 nuclear bomb (Canada, United Kingdom)
B61 nuclear bomb (Greece)
BGM-109G Ground Launched Cruise Missile (Belgium, Italy, Netherlands, United Kingdom, and West Germany)
CIM-10 Bomarc (Canada)
Mark 7 nuclear bomb (United Kingdom)
Mk 101 Lulu (Netherlands and the United Kingdom)
MGR-1 Honest John (Belgium, Canada, Greece, Italy, Netherlands, Turkey, United Kingdom, and West Germany)
MGM-1 Matador (West Germany)
MGM-5 Corporal (United Kingdom)
MGM-29 Sergeant (West Germany)
MGM-52 Lance (Belgium, Italy, Netherlands, United Kingdom, and West Germany)
MIM-14 Nike Hercules (Belgium, Greece, Italy, Netherlands, Turkey, and West Germany)
Pershing 1 (West Germany)
Pershing 1a (West Germany)
PGM-17 Thor (United Kingdom)
PGM-19 Jupiter (Italy and Turkey)
UGM-27 Polaris (Italy)
W33 and W48 Artillery Shells (Canada, Belgium, Greece, Italy, Netherlands, Turkey, United Kingdom, and West Germany)

Saudi Arabian–Pakistani agreement
It is common belief among foreign officials that Saudi Arabia and Pakistan have an understanding in which Pakistan would supply Saudi Arabia with warheads if security in the Persian Gulf was threatened. A Western official told The Times that Saudi Arabia could have the nuclear warheads in a matter of days of approaching Pakistan. Pakistan's ambassador to Saudi Arabia, Muhammed Naeem Khan, was quoted as saying, "Pakistan considers the security of Saudi Arabia not just as a diplomatic or an internal matter but as a personal matter." Naeem also said that the Saudi leadership considered Pakistan and Saudi Arabia to be one country and that any threat to Saudi Arabia is also a threat to Pakistan. Other vendors were also likely to enter into a bidding war if Riyadh indicated that it was seeking nuclear warheads. Both Saudi Arabia and Pakistan have denied the existence of any such agreement. Western intelligence sources have told The Guardian that "the Saudi monarchy paid for up to 60% of the Pakistani nuclear programme, and in return has the option to buy a small nuclear arsenal ('five to six warheads') off the shelf". Saudi Arabia has potential dual-purpose delivery infrastructure, including Tornado IDS and F-15S fighter bombers and improved Chinese CSS-2 intermediate range ballistic missiles with accuracy sufficient for nuclear warheads but delivered with high explosive warheads.

In November 2013, a variety of sources told BBC Newsnight that Saudi Arabia was able to obtain nuclear weapons from Pakistan at will. The new-report further stated, according to western experts, it was alleged that Pakistan's defense sector, including its missile and defense labs, had received plentiful financial assistance from Saudi Arabia. Gary Samore, an adviser to Barack Obama, said, "I do think that the Saudis believe that they have some understanding with Pakistan that, in extremis, they would have claim to acquire nuclear weapons from Pakistan." Amos Yadlin, formerly head of Israeli military intelligence, said "They already paid for the bomb, they will go to Pakistan and bring what they need to bring."

Response
According to the US based think-tank, the Center for Strategic and International Studies, the BBC report on possible nuclear sharing between Pakistan and Saudi Arabia is partially incorrect. There is no indication of the validity or credibility of the BBC's sources, and the article fails to expand on what essentially constitutes an unverified lead. Furthermore, if Pakistan were to transfer nuclear warheads onto Saudi soil, it is highly unlikely that either nation would face any international repercussions if both nations were to follow strict nuclear sharing guidelines like those of NATO. A research paper produced by the British House of Commons Defence Select Committee states that as long as current NATO nuclear sharing arrangements remain in place, the NATO states would have few valid grounds for complaint if such a transfer were to occur.

Preparations for Russia–Belarus nuclear weapons sharing
On 27 February 2022, shortly after the 2022 Russian invasion of Ukraine, Belarusians voted in a referendum to repeal the post-Soviet Constitutional prohibition on basing of nuclear weapons in Belarus. At a meeting on 25 June 2022, Russian President Putin and President of Belarus Lukashenko agreed the deployment of Russian short-range nuclear-capable missiles. The deployment of nuclear warheads for nuclear sharing would require a further decision, possibly after a number of years, and might be tied to future NATO decisions.

Russia will supply Belarus with nuclear-capable Iskander-M missile systems. Both conventional and nuclear versions of the missile would be provided to the Belarusians. Additionally, Putin said that he would facilitate the modifications necessary for Belarusian Su-25 bombers to carry nuclear missiles.

Nuclear Non-Proliferation Treaty considerations
Both the Non-Aligned Movement and critics within NATO believe that NATO's nuclear sharing violates Articles I and II of the Nuclear Non-Proliferation Treaty (NPT), which prohibit the transfer and the acceptance of direct or indirect control, respectively, over nuclear weapons.

The United States insists that its forces control the weapons and that no transfer of the nuclear bombs or control over them is intended "unless and until a decision were made to go to war, at which the NPT would no longer be controlling", so there is no breach of the NPT. However, the pilots and other staff of the "non-nuclear" NATO countries practice handling and delivering the US nuclear bombs, and non-US warplanes have been adapted to deliver US nuclear bombs which involved the transfer of some technical nuclear weapons information. Even if the US argument is considered legally correct, some argue such peacetime operations appear to contravene both the objective and the spirit of the NPT. Essentially, all preparations for waging nuclear war have already been made by supposedly non-nuclear weapon states.

At the time the NPT was being negotiated, the NATO nuclear sharing agreements were secret. These agreements were disclosed to some of the states, including the Soviet Union, negotiating the treaty along with the NATO arguments for not treating them as proliferation. Most of the states that signed the NPT in 1968 would not have known about these agreements and interpretations at that time.

See also
1958 US–UK Mutual Defence Agreement
United States military deployments around the world
U.S. nuclear weapons in Japan
Taiwan and weapons of mass destruction

References

External links
NATO Nuclear Sharing, Tim Street, Oxford Research Group, ORG Explains No. 5, June 2018
U.S. Nuclear Weapons in Europe, Hans M. Kristensen, Natural Resources Defense Council, February 2005
NATO Nuclear Sharing and the NPT – Questions to be Answered, joint PENN/BASIC-BITS-CESD-ASPR Research Note 97.3, June 1997
Questions of Command and Control: NATO, Nuclear Sharing and the NPT, PENN Research Report 2000.1, Martin Butcher et al., 2000
Nuclear Sharing in NATO: Is it Legal?, Otfried Nassauer, Institute for Energy and Environmental Research, May 2001
Questions of Command and Control: NATO, Nuclear Sharing and the NPT, Project on European Nuclear Non-Proliferation, March 2000
NATO Nuclear Power Sharing and the NPT, Denise Groves, Berlin Information-center for Transatlantic Security, 6 August 2000
NATO's Positions Regarding Nuclear Non-Proliferation, Arms Control and Disarmament and Related Issues, NATO, June 2005
United States Air Forces in Europe – Munitions Support Squadron, GlobalSecurity.org
Statement on behalf of the non-aligned state parties to the Treaty on the Non-Proliferation of Nuclear Weapons, 2 May 2005
Opposition to Nuclear Sharing Leads to Proposed Senate Amendment on NATO Expansion, British American Security Information Council, May 1998
NPT à la Carte? NATO and Nuclear Non-Proliferation, Nicola Butler, Acronym Institute, 2005
A Constructed Peace: The Making of the European Settlement, 1945–1963 (Chapter 5: Eisenhower and Nuclear Sharing), Marc Trachtenberg, 1999, Princeton University Press, 
Commitment to purpose : how alliance partnership won the cold war, Richard L. Kugler, RAND, MC-190-RC/FF, 1993, 
The Woodrow Wilson Center's Nuclear Proliferation International History Project or NPIHP is a global network of individuals and institutions engaged in the study of international nuclear history through archival documents, oral history interviews and other empirical sources.
Soviet Nuclear Weapons in Hungary 1961–1991

Nuclear weapons policy
Politics of NATO
Sharing